Macdonald Elementary School may refer to:

Macdonald Elementary School (Warminster, Pennsylvania)
F. H. MacDonald Elementary (Thorburn, Nova Scotia)
R C Macdonald Elementary School (British Columbia)
Sir William MacDonald Elementary School (Vancouver, British Columbia)
H. M. MacDonald Elementary School (Antigonish, Nova Scotia)
MacDonald Elementary School (Dominion, Nova Scotia)

See also:
McDonald Elementary School (disambiguation)